Barnewall is a surname. Notable people with the surname include:

Anthony Barnewall (1721–1739), German army officer
John Barnewall (disambiguation)
Nicholas Barnewall (disambiguation)
Patrick Barnewall (disambiguation)

See also
Viscount Barnewall
Barnewall baronets